is a Japanese singer-songwriter. He is represented with Stardust Promotion and his record label is Warner Music Japan.

Biography
Sashida was born in Tokyo. He started playing the piano at the age of three, and he continued to play until he graduated from junior high school. Later on Sashida aimed to become a professional during his first year at high school, and started going to voice training.

In 2010 he applied to Warner Music Japan's Voice Power Audition: 100-nen Vocalist o Sagase and won the Grand Prix. Sashida later started his major debut with the single "bird / Yūyake Kōzokudōro" in 12 October 2011.

In 2012, Sashida made an appearance as a guest artist at the annual touring ice show Fantasy on Ice, where he performed live with figure skater and two-time Olympic champion, Yuzuru Hanyu, to the song "Hana ni nare" (lit. "Be a flower").

Discography

Single

Albums

Music videos

Tie-ups

Live tours

Filmography

TV series

Radio

References

External links
 
 
 
 

Japanese male rock singers
Japanese male pop singers
Japanese male singer-songwriters
Japanese singer-songwriters
Stardust Promotion artists
Warner Music Japan artists
Singers from Tokyo
Fantasy on Ice guest artists
1986 births
Living people
21st-century Japanese singers
21st-century Japanese male singers